Juan Alberto Ramírez Pérez (born June 11, 1992, in Veracruz City, Veracruz) is a professional Mexican footballer who last played for Real Cuautitlán.

References

External links
 

1992 births
Living people
Mexican footballers
Association football midfielders
C.D. Veracruz footballers
Lobos BUAP footballers
Club Atlético Zacatepec players
Ascenso MX players
Liga Premier de México players
Tercera División de México players
Footballers from Veracruz
People from Veracruz (city)